The 2022 Big Ten women's basketball tournament was a postseason tournament held from March 2–6, 2022 at Gainbridge Fieldhouse in Indianapolis. The winner of this tournament, Iowa, earned an automatic bid to the 2022 NCAA Division I women's basketball tournament.

Seeds
All 14 Big Ten schools are participating in the tournament. Teams will be seeded by 2021–22 Big Ten Conference season record. The top 10 teams receive a first-round bye and the top four teams receive a double bye.

Schedule

Bracket
 All times are Eastern.

* denotes overtime period

References

Big Ten women's basketball tournament
2021–22 Big Ten Conference women's basketball season
Big Ten Men's Tournament, 2008
College basketball tournaments in Indiana
Women's sports in Indiana